Gyanendra Nath Pande or Gyan N Pande (died 20 January 2020) was a British civil engineer of Indian descent associated with developments in computational engineering. He was Emeritus Professor at the Centre for Civil and Computational Engineering at Swansea University and founder president of the International Centre for Computational Engineering (IC2E).

Education and career
Pande grew up in India and obtained a Bachelor of Technology in civil engineering from the Indian Institute of Technology, Kharagpur in 1959. He worked in the field of geomechanics, gaining more than ten years experience as a project engineer in tunnelling and hydroelectric installations in the Himalayas. From 1973 he studied at University of Wales (now Swansea University) from where he received a PhD in 1976.

He joined the Department of Civil Engineering of the University of Wales in 1975 as lecturer, and was awarded a 'Personal Chair' in 1994 (the same year he was awarded a DSc degree).

In 1985 he was the founding editor of the computational geomechanics journal, Computers & Geotechnics. He was the founder president of the International Centre for Computational Engineering (IC2E), an organisation instrumental in setting up research and collaborations between universities and industry.

He was Emeritus Professor at Swansea University and a Fellow of Institution of Civil Engineers.

He died on 20 January 2020.

Professional appointments
 Co-Chair, International Symposium on Computational Geomechanics
 Chief Editor, Computers & Geotechnics
 Member, Advisory Panel of Geotechnique
 Chairman, Ground Engineering Group of the Institution of Civil Engineers, Wales Branch
 Chairman, International Committee on ‘Computer Modelling of Masonry’
 Member of an expert committee appointed by Hydro-Quebec, Canada

Awards and honours
 Special Achievements in Geomechanics Award, International Association for Computer Methods and Advances in Geomechanics (IACMAG), 2014
 Manby Prize, Institution of Civil Engineers, London, 2005
 Significant paper award of IACMAG, 2001 and 2002
 Best paper award – Journal of Rock Mechanics & Tunnelling Technology, 2003

Works
Pande wrote over 250 books and research papers.

Personal and family life
Pande was a founding member and trustee of the Tridev Meditation and Spiritual Awareness Society at Swansea.

Pande's younger brother Jitendra Nath Pande was professor and head of medicine, AIIMS, New Delhi, India. He was senior consultant (medicine) at the Sitaram Bhartia Institute of Science and Research, New Delhi.

References

2020 deaths
IIT Kharagpur alumni
Alumni of the University of Wales
Academics of Swansea University
British people of Indian descent
Fellows of the Institution of Civil Engineers
Year of birth missing